Batangas Eastern Colleges (BEC), formerly known as Batangas Eastern Academy (BEA), is a private, co-educational, non-sectarian school in San Juan, Batangas, Philippines. It was founded on March 16, 1940, by Mercedes S. De Villa, the descendant of the town's founder Camilo Perez, and Iñigo S. Javier, the founder of Tayabas Western Academy. It is the oldest high school in San Juan as well as being the oldest private educational institution in the town. Its school ID number is 401647.

History

Formation years and World War II 
Batangas Eastern Colleges was founded on March 16, 1940, as "Bolbok Institute" by Mercedes Salud-de Villa and Iñigo Javier. The institution was known to be the first high school established in the town of San Juan and the first classes were started on June 12, 1940, with a total of 112 students being initially enrolled. Immediately, it was renamed "Batangas Eastern Academy". In 1941, the school was given a permit to operate as a complete high school by the Bureau of Private Schools. The enrollment grew to almost 200 students with the launching of third-year and fourth-year classes.

With the advent of the Japanese invasion of the Philippines, all schools, including the Batangas Eastern Academy, were forced to shut down. All of the equipment and materials were transferred and hidden to the farms owned by the family of the foundress, due to the news of fears that the Japanese soldiers would commit atrocities like ransacking, looting, and burning down the establishments and households. On April 4, 1945, the town of San Juan was liberated by the combined Filipino and American soldiers and guerillas. Sadly, Iñigo Javier, the school's founder who was notable for establishing the first high school in San Juan, was killed by the Japanese soldiers.

Post-war years (1945 to 1972)
After the country was liberated in 1945 from the Japanese occupation, Batangas Eastern Academy resumed its operations to the students from San Juan, Batangas, and its neighboring towns, primarily the town of Rosario in Batangas and the towns of Tiaong and Sariaya in Quezon. On June 13, 1946, the school was again granted official recognition as a complete high school. In 1947, it branched to the barangays of Buhaynasapa in 1947 and Laiya in 1951. However, these were not turned to be financially feasible for the school, leading them to its closure. The Buhaynasapa branch of the school operated until 1953.

In 1947, the school established the College Department, which offered Junior Normal College courses that would lead to having an ETC (Elementary Teacher Certificate) for aspiring teachers and a Training Department for students from grades one to six. However, in 1958, the school stopped offering college-level as they began to focus on the operations of the high school department that was resulted from an increased number of enrollees in the said division. The college department remained dormant for the next twelve years and in 1970, the said department was revived and began offering two-year college courses in arts and science. Unfortunately on September 21, 1972, due to the declaration of Martial Law by then-President Ferdinand Marcos, all schools were forced to be closed, leading to BEA's college department became dormant until 2003.

Martial law years and beyond
In the school year 1991–1992, the Batangas Eastern Academy formed a day-care center to its campus, pioneered by then-Barangay Captain of Poblacion, Joaquin M. Salud (Libertad's husband) with support from the Department of Social Welfare and Development (DSWD). In the school year 1992–1993, the first Kindergarten classes began their operations and it began the formation of the school's pre-elementary and elementary school departments and the permits of operating these divisions were secured. On April 13, 1998, the pre-elementary and elementary school departments of Batangas Eastern Academy were recognized as a complete Elementary School by the government.

Key people

Presidents

Notable people

Alumni
Gen. Renato S. De Villa, Secretary of National Defense (1991–97)
Abelardo S. De Villa, Mayor of San Juan, Batangas (1986–1998)
Dr. Mario S. De Villa, General Surgeon of Manila Doctor's Hospital
Rodolfo H. Manalo, Mayor of San Juan, Batangas (1998–2007; 2010–2019)
Jeryk Dwight Bait, All-Star of Jr. NBA (Elementary Department graduate)

Sister schools
Tayabas Western Academy (Candelaria, Quezon)

References

External links
Official website of the Batangas Eastern Colleges

High schools in Batangas